Cabells' Predatory Reports is a paid subscription service featuring a database of deceptive and predatory journals, and a database of "verified, reputable journals", with details about those journals' acceptance rates and invited article percentages.  In June 2020, Cabells changed the name of its whitelist and blacklist to Journalytics and Predatory Reports, respectively. Cabells describes Predatory Reports as "the only database of deceptive and predatory academic journals."

Subscription
Unlike Beall's List, which went offline permanently in early 2017, Predatory Reports is available on a subscription basis. Specifically, it is available either as a standalone product or as an "add-on" at a discounted rate to subscribers to at least one discipline in Journalytics. 

The company originally considered offering its blacklist for free. It then decided that the cost of building and maintaining their list was too high for a free service.

Criteria
Cabells has produced two transparent criteria versions: v1.0 and v1.1. Cabells' v1.0 contains 64 criteria, which are organised by subject matter such as “integrity”, “peer review”, and “publication practices”. This v1.0 evaluation list was used for the preparation of the blacklist before it was launched until early 2019, when Cabell launched its new v1.1 criteria version. This v1.1 evaluation checklist features 74 behavioural indicators, which are grouped “according to relative severity and subject matter”. Some of the criteria used by Cabell to tag journals as predatory have been criticized, including, for instance, the indicator “no policies for digital preservation" whose interpretation varies according to subjectivity.

Reception
Cabell's blacklist has been criticized for including numerous empty journals, which "raises serious questions about the ways in which they prioritise journals for inclusion and their willingness to provide an up-to-date and useful blacklist to the scholarly community". Other concerns about the blacklist include "questionable weighing and reviewing methods" and "a lack of rigour in how Cabell applies its own procedures" as "identical criteria are recorded multiple times in individual journal entries" and "discrepancies exist between reviewing dates and the criteria version used and recorded by Cabell".

Jeffrey Beall has argued that journal blacklists are useful to researchers who want to know where to publish, adding that he thinks Cabell's appeals process will be one of the most challenging aspects of its blacklist to manage. Aalto University economist Natalia Zinovyeva told Nature that it will be "extremely valuable" to help academic committees evaluate researchers' CVs. Rick Anderson, the former president of the Society for Scholarly Publishing, wrote: "Overall, I find the Cabell’s Blacklist product to be a carefully crafted, honestly managed, and highly useful tool for libraries, faculty committees, and authors."

Further reading

See also 
 Journalology

References

External links

Internet properties established in 2017
Blacklisting
Bibliographic databases and indexes